Dinghu Mountain and Lake is located in Dinghu District, 18 km to the east of Zhaoqing City, in the Dayunwu Mountain Range, in Guangdong Province of southern China. It is one of the four famous mountains - Danxia, Dinghu, Xiqiao and Luofu in Guangdong province.

Known as the "green gem on the Tropic of Cancer", the mountain's peaks rise above ancient towering trees, flying waterfalls, fresh air, various birds and colorful flowers. Since ancient times, it has been a tourist attraction and a Buddhist sacred place. Its shrines attract up to 1 million visitors per year (1997).

Conservation
The Dinghu Mountain National Nature Reserve, established in 1956, was the first nature reserve in China. It is also among the first group of designated scientific research stations of the UNESCO "Man and Natural Biosphere" (since 1979).

Flora and fauna
Dinghu Mountain is known as a living nature museum and a green treasure house. With abundant plant species, it is home to over 500 species of plants, including 23 rare species in imminent danger under state protection. It is also home to various kinds of animals, including 178 species of birds and 38 species of animals, 15 species of which are under state protection.

Geography and features
Dinghu Mountain has been well known for its deep and serene gorges, cold and clean waters, major scenic areas. Heavenly Brook-Qingyun Scenic Area includes the Hundred Buddha Cave, Green Trees Surrounded by Clouds, Flying Waterfalls of the Dragon Pond, and Double Rainbows, among others. The Dinghu-Tianhu Scenic Area features the Black Dragon Playing Pearls, Dragon Mother Borrowing a Vessel, Exploring the Heavenly Lake, and so on; and Yunxi-Laoding Scenic Area has the traces of bottle gourds, Water Curtain Cave, Dragon Hidden in the Ancient Pond, White Clouds Embracing Ancient Trees.

See also
 Environment of China

References

External links

 Website about Dinghu Mountain 
 Webpage about Dinghu Mountain
 Chinese stamps featuring Dinghu Mountain

Zhaoqing
Mountains of Guangdong
Tourist attractions in Guangdong
Biosphere reserves of China